This is a list of works by Punjabi writer Bhai Vir Singh (1872–1957). This list includes his poetry, novels, translations, plays, and non-fiction.

Fiction

Poetry

Epics
 Rana Surat Singh (ਰਾਣਾ ਸੂਰਤ ਸਿੰਘ [The Prince Beautiful], 1905)

Collections of Poems
 Dil Tarang (ਦਿਲ ਤਰੰਗ, [Heart Waves], 1920)
 Tarel Tupke (ਤਰੇਲ ਤੁਪਕੇ, [Dew Drops], 1921)
 Lehran de Haar (ਲਹਿਰਾੰ ਦੇ ਹਾਰ [Garlands of Excitement],1921)
 Matak Hulare (ਮਟਕ ਹੁਲਾਰੇ [Enticing Swaying], 1922)
 Bijliyan De Haar (ਬਿਜਲੀਆਂ ਦੇ ਹਾਰ [Garlands of Electricity], 1927)
 Preet Veena (ਪ੍ਰੀਤ ਵੀਣਾ [The Venna of Love], 1929)
 Kambdi Kalai (ਕੰਬਦੀ ਕਲਾਈ [The Trembling Wrist], 1933)
 Lehar Hulare (ਲਹਿਰ ਹੁਲਾਰੇ [Swaying Waves], 1946)
 Kant Maheli (ਕੰਤ ਮਹੇਲੀ [The Year of Trysting], 1950)
 Mere Saiyan Jeo! (ਮੇਰੇ ਸਾਂਈਆਂ ਜੀਓ! [O My Beloved],1953)
Ilum te amal

Novels
 Sundari (ਸੁੰਦਰੀ [The Beautiful Woman],1898)
 Bijay Singh (ਬਿਜੇ ਸਿੰਘ, 1899)
 Satwant Kaur Part I (ਸਤਵੰਤ ਕੌਰ ਭਾਗ ਪਹਿਲਾ, 1900)
 Sat Aukhian Ratan (ਸੱਤ ਔਖੀਆਂ ਰਾਤਾਂ, 1919)
 Baba Naudh Singh (ਬਾਬਾ ਨੌਧ ਸਿੰਘ, 1907, 1921)
 Satwant Kaur Part II (ਸਤਵੰਤ ਕੌਰ ਭਾਗ ਦੂਜਾ, 1927)
 Rana Bhador (ਰਾਣਾ ਭਬੋਰ)

Translation
 Bharthari Hari Jeewan te Neeti Shatak (ਭਰਥੀ ਹਰੀ ਜੀਵਨ [The Prosporious Lifestyle of Bharat], 1916)

Plays
 Raja Lakhdata Singh (ਰਾਜਾ ਲਖਦਾਤਾ ਸਿੰਘ, 1910)
 Nanan Parjhai (ਨਿਨਾਣ ਭਰਜਾਈ, 1951)

Non-Fiction

Biographies
 Sri Kalghidhar Chamatkar (ਸ੍ਰੀ ਕਲਗੀਧਰ ਚਮਤਕਾਰ [The Genius of the King with the Plume], 1925)
 Puratan Janamsakhi (ਪੁਰਾਤਨ ਜਨਮ ਸਾਖੀ [The Traditional Birth Account], 1926)
 Sri Guru Nanak Chamatkar (ਸ੍ਰੀ ਗੁਰੂ ਨਾਨਕ ਚਮਤਕਾਰ [The Genius Sri Guru Nanak], 1928)
 Bhai Jhanda Jio ([ਭਾਈ ਝੰਡਾ ਜੀਓ], 1933)
 Bhai Bhumia & Kaljug di Sakhi (ਭਾਈ ਭੂਮੀਆਂ ਅਤੇ ਕਲਿਜੁਗ ਦੀ ਸਾਖੀ, 1936)
 Sant Gatha (2 Volumes) (ਸੰਤ ਗਾਥਾ [Tales of Various Saints], 1938)
 Sri Asht Guru Chamatkar Vol.-I & II (ਸ੍ਰੀ ਅਸ਼ਟ ਗੁਰ ਚਮਤਕਾਰ ਭਾਗ - ੧ ਤੇ ੨, 1952)
 Gursikh Warhi (ਗੁਰਸਿੱਖ ਵਾੜੀ [The Efflorescence of a Sikh of the Guru], 1951)
 Gur Balam Sakhian Guru Nanak Dev Ji (ਸ੍ਰੀ ਗੁਰੂ ਨਾਨਕ ਦੇਵ ਜੀ ਦੀਆਂ ਗੁਰ ਬਾਲਮ ਸਾਖੀਆਂ, 1955)
 Gur Balam Sakhian Guru Gobind Singh Ji (ਸ੍ਰੀ ਗੁਰੂ ਗੋਬਿੰਦ ਸਿੰਘ ਜੀ ਦੀਆਂ ਗੁਰ ਬਾਲਮ ਸਾਖੀਆਂ, 1955)

Learned Works and Interpretations
 Sikhan di Bhagat Mala (ਸਿਖਾਂ ਦੀ ਭਗਤ ਮਾਲਾ, 1912)
 Prachin Panth Prakash (ਪ੍ਰਾਚੀਨ ਪੰਥ ਪ੍ਰਕਾਸ਼ [Enlightenment Guide of the Old Order], 1914)
 Ganj Namah Steek (ਗੰਜ ਨਾਮਹ ਸਟੀਕ, 1914)
 Sri Guru Granth Kosh (ਸ੍ਰੀ ਗੁਰੂ ਗ੍ਰੰਥ ਕੋਸ਼ [Sri Guru Granth Dictionary], 1927)
 Sri Gur Partap Suraj Granth (ਸ੍ਰੀ ਗੁਰਪ੍ਰਤਾਪ ਸੂਰਜ ਗਰੰਥ ਸਟਿੱਪਣ, 1927-1935)
 Devi Poojan Partal (ਦੇਵੀ ਪੂਜਨ ਪੜਤਾਲ (A Scrutiny into the Worship of Deities, 1932)
 Panj Granthi Steek (ਪੰਜ ਗ੍ਰੰਥੀ ਸਟੀਕ, 1940)
 Kabit Bhai Gurdas (ਕਬਿੱਤ ਭਾਈ ਗੁਰਦਾਸ, 1940)
 Varan Bhai Gurdas (ਵਾਰਾਂ ਭਾਈ ਗੁਰਦਾਸ [Ballads of Bhai Gurdas)
 Ban Yudh (ਬਨ ਜੁੱਧ)
 Sakhi Pothi (ਸਾਖੀ ਪੋਥੀ [The Book of Accounts], 1950)

Posthumous
 Gurmat Nam (ਗੁਰਮਤਿ ਨਾਮੁ [The Lord's Name in Sikhism], 1958)
 Santhya Sri Guru Granth Sahib Vol.- I (ਸੰਥਆ ਸ੍ਰੀ ਗੁਰੂ ਗ੍ਰੰਥ ਸਾਹਿਬ ਪੋਥੀ ਪਹਿਲੀ, 1958)
 Santhya Sri Guru Granth Sahib Vol.- II (ਸੰਥਆ ਸ੍ਰੀ ਗੁਰੂ ਗ੍ਰੰਥ ਸਾਹਿਬ ਪੋਥੀ ਦੂਜੀ, 1958)
 Santhya Sri Guru Granth Sahib Vol.- III (ਸੰਥਆ ਸ੍ਰੀ ਗੁਰੂ ਗ੍ਰੰਥ ਸਾਹਿਬ ਪੋਥੀ ਤੀਜੀ, 1959)
 Santhya Sri Guru Granth Sahib Vol.- IV (ਸੰਥਆ ਸ੍ਰੀ ਗੁਰੂ ਗ੍ਰੰਥ ਸਾਹਿਬ ਪੋਥੀ ਚੌਥੀ, 1960)
 Santhya Sri Guru Granth Sahib Vol.- V (ਸੰਥਆ ਸ੍ਰੀ ਗੁਰੂ ਗ੍ਰੰਥ ਸਾਹਿਬ ਪੋਥੀ ਪੰਜਵੀਂ, 1961)
 Santhya Sri Guru Granth Sahib Vol.- VI (ਸੰਥਆ ਸ੍ਰੀ ਗੁਰੂ ਗ੍ਰੰਥ ਸਾਹਿਬ ਪੋਥੀ ਛੇਵੀਂ, 1962)
 Santhya Sri Guru Granth Sahib Vol.- VII (ਸੰਥਆ ਸ੍ਰੀ ਗੁਰੂ ਗ੍ਰੰਥ ਸਾਹਿਬ ਪੋਥੀ ਸੱਤਵੀਂ, 1962)
 Sri Guru Gobind Singh Ji De Pavittar Jeevan Vichon Kujh Chamatkar (1967)
 Amar Lekh (3 Volumes) (ਅਮਰ ਲੇਖ, 1967)
 Awaz Aai (ਆਵਾਜ਼ ਆਈ [Along Came the Sound], 1971)
 Sikan Sadhran (ਸਿੱਕਾਂ ਸੱਧਰਾਂ [Wealth of Wishes], 1973)
 Sahitak Kaliyan (ਸਾਹਿਤਕ ਕਲੀਆਂ, 1973)
 Sant Bimla Singh (ਸੰਤ ਬਿਮਲਾ ਸਿੰਘ, 1974)
 Pyaar Athru (ਪਿਆਰ ਅੱਥਰੂ [Tears of Love], 1980)
 Sri Asht Guru Chamatkar Vol.-III (ਸ੍ਰੀ ਅਸ਼ਟ ਗੁਰ ਚਮਤਕਾਰ ਭਾਗ - ੩, 1981)
 Sukhmani Steek (ਸੁਖਮਨੀ ਸਟੀਕ, 1982)
 Bhai Vir Singh Di Chonvin Kavita (ਭਾਈ ਵੀਰ ਸਿੰਘ ਦੀ ਚੋਣਵੀਂ ਕਵਿਤਾ, 1984)
 Vir Patravli (Letters, 1990)
 Jeevan Kani (ਜੀਵਨ ਕਣੀ [The Raindrop of Life], 1993)
 Bir Darshan (ਬੀਰ ਦਰਸ਼ਨ [Glimpse of Braveness], 1993)
 Bhai Mardana (ਭਾਈ ਮਰਦਾਨਾ, 1998)
 Gurpurb Gulzar (ਗੁਰਪੁਰਬ ਗੁਲਜ਼ਾਰ, 1998)
 Pyarey de Pyara (ਪਿਆਰੇ ਦਾ ਪਿਆਰਾ [The Dearest Beloved], 1999)
-
 Aarshi Shooh (ਅਰਸ਼ੀ ਛੁਹ)
 Diwan Bhai Vir Singh (ਦੀਵਾਨ ਭਾਈ ਵੀਰ ਸਿੰਘ)
 Gurmukh Sikhya (ਗੁਰਮੁਖ ਸਿੱਖਿਆ [The Teachings of Sikhism])
 Jaap Sahib Steek (ਜਾਪੁ ਸਾਹਿਬ ਸਟੀਕ)
 Japu Ji Steek (ਜਾਪੁ ਸਾਹਿਬ ਸਟੀਕ)
 Khara Sauda (ਖ਼ਰਾ ਸੌਦਾ)
 Navin Paneeri (Guru Nanak Dev) (3 Parts)
 Navin Paneeri (Guru Gobind Singh)
 Navin Paneeri (Guru Angad Dev)
 Pritam Ji (ਪ੍ਰੀਤਮ ਜੀ [Beloved Fellow])
 Pyar Parvane (ਪਿਆਰ ਪਰਵਾਨੇ)
 Vir Suneherre (ਵੀਰ ਸੁਨੇਹੜੇ)

References

Bibliographies by writer
Bibliographies of Indian writers